Battle of Eora Creek – Templeton's Crossing may refer to:

 First Battle of Eora Creek – Templeton's Crossing: fought from 31 August 1942 to 5 September 1942
 Second Battle of Eora Creek – Templeton's Crossing: fought from 11 to 28 October 1942